The Maltese Futsal First Division is the second tier of the futsal pyramid in Malta.  It was founded in 2011.  This division currently consists of 12 teams. It is organised by the Futsal Malta Association and the Malta Football Association.

External links
Futsal Malta Association
Malta Football Association

Futsal in Malta
National futsal leagues
2011 establishments in Malta
Recurring sporting events established in 2011
Futsal leagues in Europe